Viol@ is a 1998 Italian erotic drama film directed by Donatella Maiorca.

Plot 
Marta, behind the nickname "Viol@", decided to experience the thrill of virtual sex. Her interlocutor, a mysterious man named Mittler, seems to be able to please her to the point of being able to maneuver her in all respects in real life, away from the computer.

Marta then starts to live at the mercy of the mysterious caller losing her job and her social relations. After her dog Oliver dies as a result of her irresponsibility, the woman decides to break free from the trap and to find out who Mittler is.

Cast 

Stefania Rocca as Marta
Stefano Rota as  Lorenzo
Rosanna Mortara as Laura
Rolando Ravello as  Chief
Ennio Fantastichini as  Mittler (voice) 
Neri Marcorè as  Interviewee
Maddalena Crippa

References

External links

1998 films
Italian erotic drama films
1990s erotic drama films
1998 directorial debut films
1998 drama films
1990s Italian-language films
1990s Italian films